Wales participated in the Eurovision Choir of the Year 2017. This was the second time in any of the Eurovision Network events that the United Kingdom has not participated as a unified state after 1994. The Welsh entry for the 2017 contest in Riga, Latvia was selected via the national final Côr Cymru (Choir of Wales), which took place at the Aberystwyth Arts Centre, in Aberystwyth, Wales on 9 April 2017, and organised by the Welsh broadcaster S4C.

An audition stage took place between 6–27 November 2016, to determine which acts would proceed to the next round of qualification. The semi-finals which took place between 17–19 February 2017, were divided into five categories (male voice; female voice; mixed; youth; and children's choirs) with the winner from each of the competing categories advancing to the grand final on 9 April 2017. Côr Merched Sir Gâr won the final of Côr Cymru 2017, and represented  at the Eurovision Choir of the Year 2017.

Background

The 2017 edition was the inaugural Eurovision Choir of the Year, which was Wales' second appearance in any of the Eurovision Family of Events that the country will not be represented as part of the unified state of the United Kingdom.

Before Eurovision

Côr Cymru

Côr Cymru (Choir of Wales) is the national final that was used to select the 2017 entrant. An audition stage took place between 6–27 November 2016, in which each choir presented a musical piece. Successful acts proceeded to the semi-final stage which took place between 17–19 February 2017, with one act from each of the five categories (female voice, male voice, mixed, youth, and children's choirs) advancing to a televised grand final on 9 April 2017. Both the semifinals and grand final were held at the Aberystwyth Arts Centre, in Aberystwyth, Wales.

Semi-finals

Youth Choir
Four acts in the Youth Choir category, competed in the semi-final at the Aberystwyth Arts Centre on 17 February 2017. Côr Merched Sir Gar advanced to the grand final.

Female voice choirs
One act participated in the Female Voice Choir category, during the semi-final at the Aberystwyth Arts Centre on 18 February 2017. Ysgol Gerdd Ceredigion advanced to the grand final.

Male voice choirs
Four acts in the Male Voice Choir category, competed in the semi-final at the Aberystwyth Arts Centre on 18 February 2017. Côr Meibion Machynlleth advanced to the grand final.

Children's choirs
Four acts in the Children's Choir category, competed in the semi-final at the Aberystwyth Arts Centre on 19 February 2017. Côr Ieuenctid Môn advanced to the grand final.

Mixed choirs
Four acts in the Mixed Choirs category, competed in the semi-final at the Aberystwyth Arts Centre on 19 February 2017. Côrdydd advanced to the grand final.

Final
The winning choirs from each of the five categories proceeded to the grand final, which took place at the Aberystwyth Arts Centre, in Aberystwyth, Wales, on 9 April 2017. Each choir performed two songs (one in English, and one in Welsh) during a 12-minute routine. A panel of international judges selected Côr Merched Sir Gâr as the winner of the 2017 competition. The international judging panel consisted of Professor Edward Higginbottom, Christopher Tin, and María Guinand.

Ratings

Song selection
On 22 July 2017, the three songs Côr Merched Sir Gâr performed at the Eurovision Choir of the Year 2017 were revealed as "O, Mountain, O", "Mil harddach" and "Wade in the Water". The songs were selected by the choir's conductor, Islwyn Evans. "O, Mountain, O" was composed by Otmar Mácha. "Mil harddach" is a traditional Welsh lullaby, having been arranged by Evans. "Wade in the Water" was arranged by Norman Luboff and adapted for performance by Evans.

The choir were placed second in the competition.

References

External links
  
  

Eurovision
2017
Wales in the Eurovision Song Contest